A contralto is a type of classical female singing voice whose vocal range is the lowest female voice type.

The contralto's vocal range is fairly rare; similar to the mezzo-soprano, and almost identical to that of a countertenor, typically between the F below middle C (F3 in scientific pitch notation) to the second F above middle C (F5), although, at the extremes, some voices can reach the D below middle C (D3) or the second B above middle C (B5). The contralto voice type is generally divided into the coloratura, lyric, and dramatic contralto.

History 
"Contralto" is primarily meaningful only in reference to classical and operatic singing, as other traditions lack a comparable system of vocal categorization. The term "contralto" is only applied to female singers; men singing in a similar range are called "countertenors". The Italian terms "contralto" and "alto" are not synonymous, "alto" technically denoting a specific vocal range in choral singing without regard to factors like tessitura, vocal timbre, vocal facility, and vocal weight. However, there exists some French choral writing (including that of Ravel and Poulenc) with a part labelled "contralto", despite the tessitura and function being that of a classical alto part. The Saracen princess Clorinde in André Campra's 1702 opera Tancrède was written for Julie d'Aubigny and is considered the earliest major role for bas-dessus or contralto voice.

Vocal range 

The contralto has the lowest vocal range of the female voice types, with the lowest tessitura.

The contralto vocal range is between tenor and mezzo-soprano.

Although tenors, baritones, and basses are male singers, some women can sing as low (albeit with a slightly different timbre and texture) as their male counterparts. Some of the rare female singers who specialized in the tenor and baritone registers include film actress Zarah Leander, the Persian āvāz singer Hayedeh, the child prodigy Ruby Helder (1890–1938), and Bavarian novelty singer Bally Prell.

Subtypes and roles in opera 
Within the contralto voice type category are three generally recognized subcategories: coloratura contralto, an agile voice specializing in florid passages; lyric contralto, a voice lighter in timbre; and dramatic contralto, the deepest, darkest, and most powerful contralto voice. The coloratura contralto was a favorite voice type of Rossini's. Many of his roles listed below were written with this type of voice in mind. Lyric contraltos are heavily utilized in both the French and English operatic repertoire. Many of the Gilbert and Sullivan contralto roles are best suited with a lyric contralto voice. Ma Moss in The Tender Land is a notable lyric contralto role. The dramatic contralto voice is heard in much of the German operatic repertoire. Erda in Der Ring des Nibelungen and Gaea in Daphne are both good examples of the dramatic contralto.

True operatic contraltos are rare, and the operatic literature contains few roles written specifically for them. Contraltos sometimes are assigned feminine roles like Teodata in Flavio, Angelina in La Cenerentola, Rosina in The Barber of Seville, Isabella in L'italiana in Algeri, and Olga in Eugene Onegin, but more frequently they play female villains or trouser roles. Contraltos may also be cast in roles originally written for castrati. A common saying among contraltos is that they may play only "witches, bitches, or britches."

Examples of contralto roles in the standard operatic repertoire include the following:

Angelina*, La Cenerentola (Rossini)
Arnalta, L'incoronazione di Poppea (Monteverdi)
Arsace, Semiramide (Rossini)
Art Banker, Facing Goya (Nyman)
Azucena*, Il trovatore (Verdi)
Auntie*, landlady of The Boar, Peter Grimes (Britten)
The Baroness, Vanessa (Barber)
Bradamante, Alcina (Handel)
La Cieca, La Gioconda (Ponchielli)
Cornelia, Giulio Cesare (Handel)
The Countess*, The Queen of Spades (Tchaikovsky)
Didone, Egisto (Cavalli)
Dryade, Ariadne auf Naxos (Strauss)
Erda, Das Rheingold, Siegfried (Wagner)
Felicia, Il crociato in Egitto (Meyerbeer)
Madame Flora (Baba), The Medium (Menotti)
Fidès, Le prophète (Meyerbeer)
Florence Pike, Albert Herring (Britten)
Gaea, Daphne (Strauss)
Geneviève, Pelléas et Mélisande (Debussy)
Griselda, Griselda (Vivaldi)
Hélène Bezukhova, War and Peace (Prokofiev)
Hippolyta, A Midsummer Night's Dream (Britten)
Isabella*, L'italiana in Algeri (Rossini)
Katisha, The Mikado (Gilbert and Sullivan)
Klytemnestra*, Elektra (Richard Strauss)
Lel, The Snow Maiden (Rimsky-Korsakov)
Little Buttercup, H.M.S. Pinafore (Gilbert and Sullivan)
Lucretia, The Rape of Lucretia (Britten)
Maddalena*, Rigoletto (Verdi)
Magdelone, Maskarade (Nielsen)
Mamma Lucia, Cavalleria rusticana (Mascagni)
Ma Moss, The Tender Land (Copland)
Malcolm*, La donna del lago (Rossini)
Margret, Wozzeck (Berg)
Maria, Porgy and Bess (Gershwin)
The Marquise of Berkenfield, La fille du régiment (Donizetti)
Marthe, Faust (Gounoud)
Marilyn Klinghoffer, The Death of Klinghoffer (Adams)
Mary, Der fliegende Holländer (Wagner)
Miss Todd, The Old Maid and the Thief (Menotti)
Mother, The Consul (Menotti)
Mother Goose, Mother Goose (Felix Jarrar)
Mother Goose, The Rake's Progress (Stravinsky)
Mrs. Noye, Noye's Fludde (Britten)
Mrs. Prin, Tabula Rasa (Felix Jarrar)
Mistress Quickly, Falstaff (Verdi)
Norn (I), Götterdämmerung (Wagner)
Olga*, Eugene Onegin (Tchaikovsky)
Orfeo, Orfeo ed Euridice (Gluck) (originally for castrato)
Orlando, Orlando Furioso (Vivaldi)
Orsini, Lucrezia Borgia (Donizetti)
Polina, The Queen of Spades (Tchaikovsky)
Ratmir, Ruslan and Lyudmila (Glinka)
Rosina*, The Barber of Seville (Rossini)
Rosmira/Eurimene*, Partenope (Handel)
Ruth, The Pirates of Penzance (Gilbert and Sullivan)
Schwertleite, Die Walküre (Wagner)
Smeaton, Anna Bolena (Donizetti)
Sosostris, The Midsummer Marriage (Tippett)
Stella, What Next? (Carter)
Tancredi, Tancredi (Rossini)
Ulrica, Un ballo in maschera (Verdi)
Widow Begbick*, Rise and Fall of the City of Mahagonny (Weill)
3rd Woodsprite, Rusalka (Dvořák)
La Zia Principessa, Suor Angelica (Puccini)
Zita, Gianni Schicchi (Puccini)

* indicates a role that may also be sung by a mezzo-soprano.

See also

 Category of contraltos
 Fach, the German system for classifying voices
 List of contraltos in non-classical music
 List of operatic contraltos
 Voice classification in non-classical music

References

Further reading

External links
 
 

 
Italian opera terminology
Musical terminology
Opera terminology
Pitch (music)
Voice types